Hybrids is an eco-responsible CG animated short film directed in 2017 by 5 French 3D artists during their studies at MoPA, animation school in France. The short received numerous accolades by the CGI & VFX industry.  for its outstanding achievement in the Visual effect and CGI work quality, and has won awards in festivals including the COLCOA, the Visual Effects Society, and the Sitges Film Festival where it received the Oscar Qualifying prize for the Academy Award for Best Animated Short Film at the 91st Academy Awards.

Plot
When marine wildlife has to adapt to the pollution surrounding it, the rules of survival change.

Awards
Since its launch, the film has received numerous accolades, selections and awards around the world, including VES for the Outstanding Visual Effects in a Student Project at the 16th Visual Effects Society Awards in 2018

The short is part of the world touring screening at The animation Showcase 2018.

References

External links
 
 

2017 animated films
2017 films
2010s French animated films
French animated short films